CRE or cre may refer to:

Organizations
 Campaign for Real Education, a British educational advocacy group
 Castle Rock Entertainment, an American film and television production company 
 Center for Regulatory Effectiveness, an American lobbying firm
 China Railway Express Company, a parcel and cargo shipping arm of China Railway
 Commission de régulation de l'énergie, the French energy regulator
 Commission for Racial Equality, a former British government body
 Cumann Rothaíochta na hÉireann (Cycling Ireland), an Irish national cycling organization

Science
 cAMP response element, a type of DNA sequence bound to by CREB
 Carbapenem-resistant enterobacteriaceae, an antibiotic-resistant bacteria family
 Chemical reaction engineering, chemical engineering or industrial chemistry dealing with chemical reactors
 Cis-acting replication element, a component of many RNA viruses
 Cis-regulatory element, regions of non-coding DNA which regulate the transcription of neighboring genes
 Cre recombinase, an enzyme that catalyzes a type of site-specific homologous recombination
 I-CreI, a homing endonuclease

Transport
 CRE, LRT station abbreviation for Coral Edge LRT station, Singapore
 CRE, National Railway station code for Crewe railway station, Cheshire, England

Other
 Camp Rock Enon, a Boy Scout camp in Virginia
 Commander, Royal Engineers, the senior Royal Engineers officer in a British Army division, usually a lieutenant-colonel
 Commercial real estate, see Commercial property
 Common Recruitment Examination, an examination for recruiting civil servants in Hong Kong
 Corporate real estate, real property held or used by a business enterprise or organization for its own operational purposes